The Institute of Engineering Assen is part of the Hanze University Groningen in the Netherlands. The institute is based in Assen where it offers a Bachelor Programme in Electrical and Electronic Engineering and a Master Programme in Sensor System Engineering. It started in September 2008 as a European pioneer in the field of sensor technology education, and is working closely together with partners such as Astron and the Nederlandse Aardolie Maatschappij BV (NAM) / Shell. From 2019, the first year students of the Bachelor were moved in Groningen's Zernike Campus, were the majority of the Hanze faculties are present.

The Electrical and Electronic Engineering Sensor Technology course has been selected seven times in a row (2019 included) as a Top Rated Programme in the Keuzegids HBO.



Photos

References

External links 
 Institute of Engineering Assen

Engineering universities and colleges in the Netherlands
Hanze University of Applied Sciences
Buildings and structures in Assen
Buildings and structures in Drenthe